The Pointe Allobrogia is a mountain of the Mont Blanc massif, overlooking the Col Ferret on the border between Italy and Switzerland. It lies at the southern end of the range south-east of Mont Dolent.

Name 
The toponym is related to the name of the Allobroges. This may be the remnant of an ancient territorial claim made by the Gallic tribe.

References

 Bibliography

External links
 Pointe Allobrogia on Hikr

Mountains of the Alps
Alpine three-thousanders
Mountains of Valais
Mountains of Aosta Valley
Italy–Switzerland border
International mountains of Europe
Mountains of Switzerland
Allobroges